The Farrell Houses are a group of four houses on South Louisiana Street in Little Rock, Arkansas.  All four houses are architecturally significant Bungalow/Craftsman buildings designed by the noted Arkansas architect Charles L. Thompson as rental properties for A.E. Farrell, a local businessman, and built in 1914.  All were individually listed on the National Register of Historic Places for their association with Thompson.  All four are also contributing properties to the Governor's Mansion Historic District, to which they were added in a 1988 enlargement of the district boundaries.

The house at 2109 South Louisiana is a two-story frame structure, its exterior finished in dark brown brick and stucco, with a large projecting gable section at the right front.  Its roof has exposed rafter ends, and its recessed porch is supported by large Craftsman brackets. 2111 South Louisiana, also two stories, has an exterior of red brick and stucco, with three smaller gabled dormers, and a shed-roof porch. 2115 South Louisiana is differentiated from the first two by having a front-facing gable roof, with a clipped top, and a projecting gabled section on the left.  The entrance is to its right, set under a shed-roof porch.  The main house finish is red brick, with half-timbered stucco in the gables. 2121 South Louisiana is finished in dark brown brick, with brown-stuccoed half-timbered gable ends, and a cross-gabled tile roof with clipped gable ends that also featured exposed after ends and large Craftsman brackets.

See also
National Register of Historic Places listings in Little Rock, Arkansas

References

Houses on the National Register of Historic Places in Arkansas
Houses completed in 1914
American Craftsman architecture in Arkansas
Bungalow architecture in Arkansas
Houses in Little Rock, Arkansas
National Register of Historic Places in Little Rock, Arkansas
Historic district contributing properties in Arkansas